Yanagisawa (written:  or ) is a Japanese surname. Notable people with the name include:

Atsushi Yanagisawa (born 1977), Japanese footballer
Hakuo Yanagisawa (born 1935), a Japanese politician
, Japanese sprint canoeist
, Japanese footballer
Kimio Yanagisawa (born 1948), a Japanese manga artist
Ryūshi Yanagisawa (born 1972), a Japanese professional wrestler, mixed martial artist, and kickboxer 
Yanagisawa Yoshiyasu (1658-1714), a Japanese samurai
Satoshi Yanagisawa (born 1971), Japanese racewalker

Fictional characters
Naoko Yanagisawa, a  character in the manga series Cardcaptor Sakura

See also
Yanagisawa Wind Instruments

Japanese-language surnames